Sammie is a given name. Notable people with the given name include:

Sammie (born 1987), American singer
Sammie Abbott (1908–1990), American politician
Sammie Burroughs (born 1973), American football player
Sammie Coates (born 1993), American football player
Sammie Harris (born 1939), American-Canadian football player
Sammie Haynes (1920-1997), American-Negro baseball athlete
Sammie Henson (born 1971), American wrestler
Sammie Lee Hill (born 1986), American football player
Sammie Johnson (born 1992), Australian rules footballer
Sammie McLeod (born 2000), English footballer
Sammie Moreels (born 1965), Belgian racing cyclist
Sammie Okposo (1971–2022), Nigerian musical artist
Sammie Smith (born 1967), American football player
Sammie Stroughter (born 1986), American football player
Sammie Szmodics (born 1995), English footballer
Sammie Winmill (born 1948), American actress
Sammie Wood (born 1991), Australian former football player